John Summers (born 16 December 1957 in Melbourne) is an Australian sport shooter. He competed at the 1992 Summer Olympics in the mixed skeet event, in which he tied for 21st place.

References

1957 births
Living people
Skeet shooters
Australian male sport shooters
Shooters at the 1992 Summer Olympics
Olympic shooters of Australia